BBC Three is a British free-to-air public broadcast television channel owned and operated by the BBC. It was first launched on 9 February 2003 with programmes targeting 16 to 34-year-olds, covering all genres including animation, comedy, current affairs, and drama series. The television channel closed down in 2016 and was replaced by an online-only BBC Three streaming channel. After six years of being online, BBC Three returned to linear television on 1 February 2022. It broadcasts every day from 19:00 to around 04:00, timesharing with CBBC (which starts at 07:00).

BBC Three is the BBC's youth-orientated television channel, its remit to provide "innovative programming" to a target audience of viewers between 16 and 34 years old, leveraging technology as well as new talent. Unlike its commercial rivals, 90% of BBC Three's output originated from the United Kingdom. Notable exceptions were Family Guy and American Dad (both of them originating in the United States). It and sister channel BBC Four also carry occasional BBC Sport programming as an overflow for the BBC's other channels.

Following budget cuts at the BBC, the first iteration of BBC Three ceased operations on 16 February 2016, despite public opposition, moving to a BBC Three-branded streaming channel on the iPlayer. It returned to broadcast television in the form of a late-night strand on BBC One on Monday to Wednesday nights since 4 March 2019. On 2 March 2021, the BBC confirmed that it planned to relaunch BBC Three's linear television channel in 2022 subject to regulatory approval, which was approved in November that year.

History

Original run

In mid-2000, the BBC decided to reposition and rebrand their two digital channels so that they could be more closely linked to the well established BBC One and BBC Two. Their plan was for BBC Knowledge to be replaced with BBC Four (which took place in 2002) and for BBC Choice to be replaced with BBC Three. However, questions were raised over the proposed format of the new BBC Three, as some thought the new format would be too similar to the BBC's commercial rivals, namely ITV2 & E4 at the time. It would be unnecessary competition. Whilst BBC Four, the BBC's proposed children's channels and digital radio stations all received approval, the BBC Three plans were rejected in September 2001.

The channel was eventually given the go ahead, eleven months after the original launch date on 17 September 2002, following a change to the remit of the channel where a 15-minute news programme and an altered target age range of 25-34 audiences. BBC Three was launched on 9 February 2003. The channel was launched by Stuart Murphy, who previously ran BBC Choice, and before that UK Play, the now-discontinued UKTV music and comedy channel. At 33, Murphy was still the youngest channel controller in the country, a title he had held since launching UK Play at the age of 26; although on 20 October 2005 it was announced that Murphy was soon to leave the channel to work in commercial television.
On 12 May 2011, BBC Three was added to the Sky EPG in the Republic of Ireland on channel 229. It was later moved to channel 210 on 3 July 2012, to free up space for new channels.

For the duration of the 2012 Summer Olympics, BBC Three increased its broadcasting hours to 24 hours to provide extra coverage of Olympic events. Broadcast hours were extended again for the 2014 Commonwealth Games with BBC Three broadcasting from 9:00 am to 4:00 am for the duration of the games. On 16 July 2013 the BBC announced that a high-definition (HD) simulcast of BBC Three would be launched by early 2014. The channel launched on 10 December 2013.

The former controller of the station, Zai Bennett, left to join Sky Atlantic in July 2014, at which point BBC Three commissioner Sam Bickley became acting controller.

Replacement by Internet service

In February 2014, BBC Director-General Tony Hall announced that cuts of £100 million would have to be made at the corporation; Hall stated that the corporation could be forced to close one of its television services as a cost-savings measure. On 5 March 2014, Hall announced a proposal to convert BBC Three, discontinuing it as an "open" television service and turn it into an over-the-top Internet television service with a smaller programming budget and a focus on short-form productions. These changes formed part of a package of proposals from the BBC, including extending CBBC's hours, reallocating £30 million on BBC One audiences for drama, and launching a one-hour timeshift channel of BBC One. There was notable backlash against the measures, with celebrities including Greg James, Matt Lucas and Jack Whitehall speaking out. A petition against the move on change.org has gathered over 300,000 signatures. However, there was some support from media commentators, and those who backed a "slimmer" BBC.

When the BBC revealed the full detail in December 2014, it admitted there was widespread opposition from BBC Three viewers but said there was support for the wider package of proposals. They believed the public welcomed a BBC One +1 as it admits "a vast majority of viewing still takes place on linear channels". The "Save BBC Three'" campaign pointed out this was a contradiction to what the BBC said about BBC Three. The BBC Trust began a 28-day public consultation regarding the plans on 20 January 2015 and it ended with a protest outside Broadcasting House. As part of the consultation a letter of 750 names against the move from the creative industry was sent to the BBC Trust, and this had the backing of a number of celebrities including Daniel Radcliffe, Aidan Turner, Olivia Colman and Lena Headey. The polling company ICM concluded a "large majority" of those that replied to the consultation were against the move, with respondents particularly concerned about those who cannot stream programming online, the effect of the content budget cuts, and the BBC's own admission the audience numbers would drop.

Despite significant public opposition, the proposal was provisionally approved by the BBC Trust in June 2015, and nonetheless the BBC Trust issued its final decision to approve the transition in November 2015, citing the fact that younger audiences have increasingly migrated to online television content as opposed to linear television channels, and the BBC's ability to "deliver more distinctive content online, while bearing down on costs". Conditions were imposed on other BBC properties to complement the changes; BBC One and Two will be required to develop "distinctive programmes designed for younger audiences", as well as air encores of all full-length programmes that originally premiere on the BBC Three online service. The Trust also approved related proposals to allow first-run and third-party content on iPlayer, as well as extend CBBC's broadcast day to 9:00 p.m. The BBC One timeshift service was rejected, citing "limited public value". Jimmy Mulville and Jon Thoday of independent production companies Hat Trick Productions and Avalon reportedly considered legal action against the Trust if it went ahead with the closure of the channel. They had previously offered to buy the channel to keep it on television, but the BBC said the channel was not up for sale.

BBC Three ended regular programming during the early morning of 16 February 2016. Its final programme was an episode of Gavin & Stacey, introduced by co-star James Corden from the Los Angeles studio of his U.S. talk show The Late Late Show. The channel space carried promotional information regarding the BBC Three online service as well as limited programming until it officially shut down on 31 March.

From March 2019, programmes from the new service were carried by BBC One from Monday to Wednesday after the BBC News at Ten under the name BBC Three on BBC One.

Return to linear television 
In May 2020, the BBC submitted its annual general plan for 2020–2021. It stated that the broadcaster was considering reinstating BBC Three as a linear channel with a doubled budget, citing that its content "now has the potential to reach a wider audience on a linear channel, as well as the key demographic which will continue to watch online." A number of series carried by the service, including Fleabag and Normal People, had achieved strong critical acclaim, with Fleabag in particular winning multiple Primetime Emmy Awards.

On 2 March 2021, the BBC officially announced plans to reinstate BBC Three as a linear channel by January 2022, subject to approval by Ofcom. As before, it will timeshare with the CBBC channel and broadcast from 7:00 p.m. to 4:00 a.m. nightly. There will be pre-watershed programming targeting teenagers as part of the schedule.

On 16 September 2021, the UK media regulator Ofcom announced provisional approval for allowing BBC Three to return as a broadcast channel in 2022. As a public service channel it has the right to appear in the top 24 channels on EPGs. Sky complained that this would cause other channels to be bumped down the list to a less prominent position. On 25 November 2021, Ofcom announced it had given final approval for BBC Three to relaunch as a broadcast channel with a set period of February 2022, one month later than originally expected. A final logo of BBC Three as a streaming service was handled over the relaunched linear service; however, instead of pink, it uses a lime green colour.

On 5 January 2022, CBBC returned to its pre-2016 hours and BBC Three began test broadcasts on 10 January 2022 ahead of its relaunch on 1 February 2022. Following an introduction by Bimini Bon-Boulash, the relaunched channel's first programme was The Launch Party, a preview special hosted by BBC Radio 1's Clara Amfo and Greg James. This was followed by news programme The Catch Up, an Eating With My Ex celebrity special, and the premieres of RuPaul's Drag Race: UK Versus the World, Lazy Susan, and the documentary Cherry Valentine: Gypsy Queen and Proud.

On 8 September 2022, the BBC decided to scrap all programming on the channel to preserve the bandwidth for BBC News's breaking news coverage of Elizabeth II. Unlike BBC One and BBC Two there were not too many amendments to the schedule over the following days, with Thursday's MOTDx  being moved to 9pm on Friday 9 September 2022 and a repeat of Sky High Club: Scotland and Beyond being added to the line-up afterwards to make up the time where Canada's Drag Race was initially scheduled.

BBC Three HD

A high-definition version of BBC Three launched on 10 December 2013 along with high-definition versions of BBC Four, BBC News, CBBC and CBeebies. 

Closed in 2016, BBC Three HD was relaunched in 2022 to coincide with the channel’s return to linear television. However, since the channel’s closure and eventual re-launch, its bandwidth had been reallocated in Scotland (to BBC Scotland HD) and Wales (to a HD simulcast of S4C). As a result, BBC Three HD is only available on Freeview in England and Northern Ireland. The SD variant is freely available in all regions and BBC Three HD is universally available on Sky, Freesat, cable and online via BBC iPlayer.

Programming

The channel's target audience is 16–34-year-olds, and it faces heavy competition from rivals including ITV2 and E4, for an audience that the BBC has traditionally had difficulty in attracting. In 2008 it reached 26.3% of 16–34-year-olds in digital homes—the channel's highest ever such reach and above that of E4, ITV2, Dave and Sky 1.

On average, nine million people watched BBC Three every week, and it had a 2.6% share of the 15–34-year-old audience and 1.4% of the whole population, according to the Broadcasters' Audience Research Board (BARB). These ratings by BARB, the official ratings agency, average out BBC Three's viewing figures over a 24-hour period even though the channel only broadcasts in the evening, giving a distorted sense of the channel's viewership. Despite several official complaints from the BBC, BARB continued to publish figures which the BBC argues are unrepresentative.

BBC Three's programming consists of comedy, drama, spin-off series and repeated episodes of series from BBC One and BBC Two, and other programmes that attempted to alert others of their actions through a series of programmes challenging common beliefs.

An example of BBC Three's comedy output includes the award-winning comedy Little Britain, which in October 2004 broke its previous viewing record when 1.8 million viewers tuned in for a new series. Little Britain was later broadcast on the BBC's terrestrial analogue channels BBC One and BBC Two. The channel's longest-running comedy programme is Two Pints of Lager and a Packet of Crisps. Some current programmes feature stand-up comedians performing their own take on a subject, usually the news, examples of which include Russell Howard's Good News (which later transferred to BBC Two, partly due to its success, and partly to BBC Three's move to online only) and Lee Nelson's Well Good Show.

Comedy and drama
The channel airs various comedies and dramas; one of its most popular sitcoms is Gavin & Stacey, which first aired in May 2007 and was written by and starred James Corden and Ruth Jones. The sitcom was an instant hit, with subsequent series being moved to other BBC channels and the show being granted a Christmas special. Another example is Being Human, a drama in which a ghost, a vampire and a werewolf share a flat, which has become a success and heralded several new series. American programming also features, with American Dad! and Family Guy being the notable examples.

Numerous popular series were either repeated on the channel or have spin-offs created from them. In early 2003, viewers could watch episodes of popular BBC soap opera EastEnders on BBC Three before they were broadcast on BBC One. This programming decision coincided with the relaunch of the channel and helped it break the one million viewers milestone for the first time. An episode of EastEnders Revealed, which was commissioned for BBC Three and looking behind the scenes of the programme, attracted 611,000 viewers. In 2005, BBC Three commissioned the documentary series Doctor Who Confidential, which was shown immediately after episodes of the new series of Doctor Who had been screened on BBC One. This was followed up in July 2005, when it began to screen repeats of both programmes.

In October 2005, it was announced that BBC Three had commissioned a spin-off drama series from Doctor Who, Torchwood, designed as a post-watershed science fiction drama for a more adult audience. Torchwood launched with 2.4 million viewers in October 2006. Torchwood is the first science fiction programme ever to have been commissioned by the channel, and its popularity led to it being broadcast on BBC Two for the second series, and on BBC One for subsequent series. In 2010, BBC Three began airing episodes of the fifth series of BBC drama series Waterloo Road after they had aired on BBC One as part of its 'catch-up' programming. From January 2015, BBC Three aired the remaining episodes of Waterloo Road before being repeated on BBC One later the same day.

Among its original programming, the channel also gave viewers the comedy drama Pramface, which was written by Chris Reddy and comprised 19 episodes over three series, broadcast between 2012 and 2014.

Documentaries
BBC Three also aired several youth-focused documentaries, including the BAFTA-winning Our War, Blood, Sweat and T-shirts (as well as its subsequent sequels), Life & Death Row and a season of films focused on mental illness. BBC Three also aired specialist factual documentaries, such as How Drugs Work and How Sex Works.

Stacey Dooley, since her appearance on Blood, Sweat and T-shirts in 2008, presented documentaries including Stacey Dooley in the USA (2012–14), Coming Here Soon (2012), The Natives: This is our America (2017), Beaten by My Boyfriend (2015), Stacey Dooley in Cologne: The Blame Game (2016), Sex in Strange Places (2016), Stacey Dooley: Hate and Pride in Orlando (2016), Stacey Dooley on the Frontline: Girls, Guns and Isis (2016), Brainwashing Stacey (2016), Stacey Dooley: Face to Face with Isis (2018), and several other titles under the umbrella title Stacey Dooley Investigates (2009–present).

BBC Three also commissions a number of one-off documentaries, including Growing Up Down's (2014), My Brother the Islamist (2011), Small Teen Big World (2010); Stormchaser: The Butterfly and the Tornado (2012) and The Autistic Me (2009). Many were commissioned through BBC Three's FRESH scheme which provided an opportunity for 'the next generation of directors' to make their first 60-minute documentaries for the channel.

In July 2022, a number of documentaries from the regional We Are England strand (featuring celebrities such as Bimini, Jayde Adams and Jassa Ahluwalia) were repeated on BBC Three, alongside a number of similarly formatted 30 minute documentaries, now made to get a premiere showing on BBC Three. However, rather than being grouped under a master brand, like BBC One's We Are England or Our Lives programmes, these new documentaries are now just being listed under one off titles such as Filthy Business and Queen of Trucks on the BBC iPlayer and in programme guides.

News and sport
In its original incarnation, BBC Three featured 60 Seconds, an hourly summary of news, sport and entertainment headlines. They were presented in a relaxed style in keeping with the rest of the channel. As part of the BBC's discussions with the government regarding the founding of the channel, a longer news programme had been promised to provide a daily section of news and current affairs. The News Show, as it came to be called upon launch, was later rebranded The 7 O'Clock News. However, the BBC discontinued the bulletin in 2005, following a recommendation made in the 2004 Barwise Report, which found that the channel's target audience sought news from elsewhere. Upon the 2022 relaunch of BBC Three, a new summary of news, sport and entertainment was launched under the name The Catch Up.

The channel has also shown sports programming. Match of the Day Live broadcast international football matches featuring Wales, often when an England match was being shown on BBC One. The channel also showed some matches of England's Women's team. The 2002, 2004, 2006 and 2008 Africa Cup of Nations tournaments were shown on the channel, while it is scheduled to air the semi-finals and final of the 2021 edition.

List of series

General comedy

 Brain Candy (2003)
 2004: The Stupid Version (2004)
 Three's Outtakes (2005–2010)
 Welcome To My World: Funny Business (2006)
 Conning The Conmen (2007)
 It's Adam and Shelley (2007)
 Two Pints of Lager: The Outtakes (2008–2011)
 The Wall (2008)
 Russell Howard's Good News (2009–2013)
 Special 1 TV (2010–2011)
 World's Craziest Fools (2011–2013)
 The Pranker (2011)
 World Series of Dating (2012)
 Unzipped (2012)
 BBC Comedy Feeds (2012–2015)
 Impractical Jokers UK (2012–2014)
 People Just Do Nothing (2014–2015)

One-off comedy pilots/specials

 Sort-It-Out-Man (2003)
 The Bunk Bed Boys (2004)
 Sweet and Sour (2004)
 From Bard to Verse (2004)
 Killing Time (2004)
 Hurrah for Cancer (2004)
 AD/BC: A Rock Opera (2004)
 10:96: Training Night (2005)
 Marigold (2005)
 Cubby Couch (2006)
 Bash (2007) 
 Living With Two People You Like Individually... But Not As A Couple (2007)
 Under One Roof (2007)
 Green (2007)
 Moonmonkeys (2007)
 Be More Ethnic (2007)
 Biffovision (2007)
 Splitting Cells (2007)
 Placebo (2008)
 Delta Forever (2008)
 Torn Up Tales (2008)
 Barely Legal (2008)
 MeeBOX (2008)
 LifeSpam: My Child Is French (2009)
 Ketch! And HIRO-PON Get It On (2009)
 Vidiotic (2009)
 Things Talk (2009)
 Brave Young Men (2009)
 Mark's Brilliant Blog (2009)
 May Contain Nuts (2009)
 The Site (2009)
 Above Their Station (2010)
 This Is Jinsy (2010)
 Laughter Shock (2010)
 Stanley Park (2010)
 Dappers (2010)
 The Inn Mates (2010)
 The Klang Show (2010)
 The Adventures Of Daniel (2010)
 D.O.A. (2010)
 Chris Moyles' Comedy Empire (2012)
 The Comedy Marathon Spectacular (2012)
 An Idiot's Guide To Politics (2015)
 The Totally Senseless Gameshow (2015)

Sketch comedy

 3 Non-Blondes (2003)
 Monkey Dust (2003–2005)
 Little Britain (2003–2004)
 The Comic Side of 7 Days (2005)
 High Spirits with Shirley Ghostman (2005)
 Tittybangbang (2005–2007)
 Man Stroke Woman (2005–2007)
 The Message (2006)
 Touch Me, I'm Karen Taylor (2006–2008)
 Little Miss Jocelyn (2006)
 Comedy Shuffle (2007)
 Rush Hour (2007)
 Marc Wootton Exposed (2008)
 Scallywagga (2008–2010)
 The Wrong Door (2008)
 Horne & Corden (2009)
 La La Land (2010)
 Lee Nelson's Well Good Show (2010–2011)
 Wu-How: The Ninja How To Guide (2010)
 One Non Blonde: Down Under (2010)
 The Revolution Will Be Televised (2012–2015)
 Lee Nelson's Well Funny People (2013)
 Boom Town (2013)
 Lazy Susan (2022–present)

Comedy gameshow
 Celebdaq (2003)
 HeadJam (2004)
 Stars in Fast Cars (2005–2006)
 Rob Brydon's Annually Retentive (2006–2007)
 The King is Dead (2010)
 24 Hour Panel People (2011)
 Sweat the Small Stuff (2013–2015)

Sitcom

 Swiss Toni (2003–2004)
 Two Pints of Lager and a Packet of Crisps (2003–2011)
 Grass (2003)
 Nighty Night (2004)
 15 Storeys High (2004)
 Catterick (2004)
 Cyderdelic (2004)
 Coupling (2004)
 The Mighty Boosh (2004–2007)
 The Smoking Room (2004–2005)
 My Life In Film (2004)
 Ideal (2005–2011)
 I'm with Stupid (2005–2006)
 Snuff Box (2006)
 Grownups (2006–2009)
 Live!Girls! present Dogtown (2006)
 Pulling (2006–2009)
 Thieves Like Us (2007)
 Gavin & Stacey (2007–2008, 2022-)
 Coming of Age (2007–2011)
 The Visit (2007)
 How Not to Live Your Life (2007–2011)
 Lunch Monkeys (2008–2011)
 Trexx and Flipside (2008)
 Massive (2008)
 Clone (2008)
 Off the Hook (2009)
 We Are Klang (2009)
 The Gemma Factor (2010)
 Mongrels (2010–2011)
 Him & Her (2010–2013)
 White Van Man (2011–2012)
 Pramface (2012–2014)
 Dead Boss (2012)
 Bad Education (2012–2014)
 Cuckoo (2012–2014; 2022)
 Some Girls (2012–2014)
 Way to Go (2013)
 Bluestone 42 (2013)
 Badults (2013–2014)
 Uncle (2014–2015)
 Siblings (2014–2016)
 Crims (2015)
 Murder in Successville (2015)
 Top Coppers (2015)
 Fried (2015)
 Together (2015)
 Josh (2015)
 Peacock (2022–present)
 PRU (2022–present)

Comedy drama

 Grease Monkeys (2003–2004)
 Spine Chillers (2003)
 Outlaws (2004)
 Twisted Tales (2005)
 Casanova (2005)
 Funland (2005)
 Drop Dead Gorgeous (2006–2007)
 Sinchronicity (2006)
 Phoo Action (2008)
 Being Human (2008–2013)
 The Last Word Monologues (2008)
 Personal Affairs (2009)
 Mouth to Mouth (2009)
 Becoming Human (2011)
 Wreck (2022-present)

Live music and stand-up comedy

 Paul and Pauline Calf's Cheese and Ham Sandwich (2003)
 Glastonbury Festival (2003–2015)  
 The Fast Show Farewell Tour (2003)
 Eurovision Song Contest (2004–2015, 2022–) 
 28 Acts in 28 Minutes (2005) 
 MOBO Awards (2006–2013)   
 The Mighty Boosh Live (2008)
 Russell Howard Live (2009) 
 Edinburgh Comedy Fest Live (2010–2014) 
 Russell Howard Live: Dingledodies (2010)
 Three@TheFringe (2011)
 Simon Amstell: Do Nothing Live (2011) 
 Stand Up For Sport Relief (2012)
 Live at the Electric (2012–2014)
 Chris Ramsey's Comedy Fringe (2012) 
 Greg Davies Live: Firing Cheeseballs At A Dog (2012)
 Russell Howard: Right Here, Right Now (2012)
 Russell Kane: Smokescreens & Castles (2012)
 Lee Nelson Live (2013)
 Seann Walsh's Late Night Comedy Spectacular (2013–2014)
 Kevin Bridges – The Story Continues (2013)
 Jack Whitehall Live (2013)
 Nick Helm's Heavy Entertainment (2015)

Drama

 Burn It (2003)
 Bodies (2004–2006)
 Conviction (2004)
 Torchwood (2006)
 West 10 LDN (2008)
 Dis/Connected (2008)
 Spooks: Code 9 (2008)
 Personal Affairs (2009)
 Lip Service (2010–2012)
 Frankenstein's Wedding (2011)
 The Fades (2011)
 In the Flesh (2013–2014)
 Orphan Black (2013–2015)
 Murdered by My Boyfriend (2014)
 Our World War (2014)
 Waterloo Road (2015)
 Tatau (2015)
 Red Rose (2022)
 Mood (2022–present)
 Life and Death in the Warehouse (2022–present)

Documentary

 Appleton On Appleton (2003) 
 Dreamspaces (2003–2004) 
 Liquid Assets (2003–2004)
 Fatboy Slim: Musical Hooligan (2003)
 Body Hits (2003)
 Posh & Becks' Big Impression: Behind the Scenes & Extra Bits (2003)
 Mind, Body & Kick Ass Moves (2004)
 Destination Three (2005)
 Spendaholics (2005–2008)
 Doctor Who Confidential (2005–2011)
 Generation Jedi (2005)
 Forty Years of F*** (2005)
 Kick Ass Miracles (2005)
 F*** Off I'm Fat (2006)
 Japanorama (2006–2007)
 The Indestructibles (2006)
 Torchwood Declassified (2006)
 Most Annoying People (2006–2011)
 Freaky Eaters (2007–2009)
 Body Image (2007)
 Castaway: The Last 24 Hours and Castaway Exposed (2007)
 Kick Ass in a Crisis (2007)
 The Bulls**t Detective (2007)
 Say No to the Knife (2007)
 Pranks Galore (2007)
 The Most Annoying TV We Hate to Love (2007)
 The Most Annoying Pop Songs We Hate To Love (2007)
 Find Me the Face (2008)
 The Mighty Boosh: A Journey Through Time and Space (2008)
 Blood, Sweat and T-shirts (2008)
 Alesha: Look But Don't Touch (2008)
 The Most Annoying Couples We Love to Hate (2008)
 Gavin and Stacey 12 Days of Christmas (2008)
 Two Pints: Fags, Lads and Kebabs (2009)
 Comic Relief's Naughty Bits (2009)
 Two Pints: The Love Triangle (2009)
 Blood, Sweat and Takeaways (2010)
 The Autistic Me (2009)
 Stacey Dooley Investigates (2009–2015)
 My Life as an Animal (2009)
 Great Movie Mistakes (2010–2012)
 Blood, Sweat and Luxuries (2010) 
 Small Teen Big World (2010) 
 Great TV Mistakes (2010)
 Sun, Sex and Suspicious Parents (2011–2015)
 Pop's Greatest Dance Crazes (2011)
 My Brother the Islamist (2011)
 Stormchaser: The Butterfly and the Tornado (2011)
 Stacey Dooley in the USA (2012–14) 
 Coming Here Soon (2012) 
 Unsafe Sex in the City (2012) 
 Websex: What's the Harm? (2012)
 People Like Us (2013–2014)
 Hotel of Mum and Dad (2013–2014)
 Cherry Healey: Old Before My Time (2013)
 Doctor Who: Greatest Monsters & Villains (2013)
 Tough Young Teachers (2014)
 Growing Up Down's (2014)
 Junior Paramedics (2014)
 Life and Death Row (2014)
 Invasion of the Job Snatchers (2014)
 My Brother the Terrorist (2014)
 Tyger Takes On... (2014–2015)
 Excluded: Kicked Out of School (2015)
 Bangkok Airport (2015)
 Beaten by my Boyfriend (2015)
 Traffic Cops (2016)
 Sex in Strange Places (2016)
 We Are England (2022)

Chat show
 This Is Dom Joly (2003)
 The Graham Norton Effect (2005)
 Lily Allen and Friends (2008)
 Comic Relief's Big Chat With Graham Norton (2013)
 Backchat with Jack Whitehall and His Dad (2013–2014)
 Staying In With Greg & Russell (2013)

Repeats

 The Murder Game (2003)
 Angry Kid (2003)
 Absolutely Fabulous (series 5) (2003)
 EastEnders (2003–2016, 2022–)
 Spooks (2003–2009)
 Doctor Who (2005–2016)
 Top Gear (2006–2016, 2022–)
 That Mitchell and Webb Look (2006–2010)
 Giving You Everything (2008)
 Wallace and Gromit's Cracking Contraptions (2008–2009)
 The Voice UK (2012–2015)
 Live at the Apollo (2015–2016)
 Fleabag (2022–present)
 This Country (2022–present)
 Killing Eve (2022–present)
 Back to Life (2022–present)
 Waterloo Road (2023–present)

Unscripted and reality

 The 7 O'Clock News (2003–2005)
 Re:covered (2003)
 Liquid News (2003–2004)
 The Bachelor (2003–2005)
 60 Seconds (2003–2016)
 Little Angels (2004–2006)
 Slam Poets (2004)
 The House of Tiny Tearaways (2005–2007)
 The Real Hustle (2006–2012)
 Anthea Turner: Perfect Housewife (2006–2007)
 The Apprentice: You're Fired! (2006)
 Celebrity Scissorhands (2006–2008)
 The Baby Borrowers (2007)
 Kill It, Cook It, Eat It (2007–2010)
 Comic Relief Does Fame Academy (2007)
 Last Man Standing (2007–2008)
 Don't Tell the Bride (2007–2014)
 Bizarre ER (2008–2011)
 Snog Marry Avoid? (2008–2013)
 Britain's Missing Top Model (2008)
 Make My Body Younger (2008–2009)
 The World's Strictest Parents (2008–2011)
 Undercover Princes (2009)
 Young, Dumb and Living Off Mum (2009–2011)
 Freak Like Me (2010)
 I Believe in UFOs: Danny Dyer (2010)
 Hotter Than My Daughter (2010–2011)
 Dancing on Wheels (2010)
 Nicola Roberts: The Truth About Tanning (2010)
 Undercover Princesses (2010)
 Are You Fitter Than a Pensioner? (2010)
 Junior Doctors: Your Life in Their Hands (2011–2013)
 The Call Centre (2013–2014)
 Sexy Beasts (2014)
 Hair (2014)
 Killer Magic (2014–2015)
 Life Is Toff (2014)
 South Side Story (2015)
 I Survived a Zombie Apocalypse (2015)
 Asian Provocateur (2015)
 RuPaul's Drag Race: UK vs the World (2022–present)
 The Catch Up (2022–present)
 The Fast and the Farmer(ish) (2022–present)
 Hungry For It (2022–present)
 The Drop (2022–present)
 Gassed Up (2022–present)
 Love In The Flesh (2022–present)

Imports
 American Dad! (2007–2016)
 Family Guy (2006–2016)
 Jonah From Tonga (2014)
 Devin (2010)
 Ghosts (airing as 'Ghosts US') (2022–present)
 Top Gear (airing as 'Top Gear America' (2023–present)

Most watched programmes 
The following is a list of the ten most watched broadcasts on BBC3 since launch, based on Live +7 data supplied by BARB. Number of viewers does not include repeats.

Presentation

The channel's original idents were conceived by Stefan Marjoram at Aardman Animations and were used from launch until February 2008. Stuart Murphy was touring Aardman Animations looking for new programming ideas for BBC Three when he spotted the cone shaped creatures, he then took the idea back to the Lambie-Nairn agency, responsible for the BBC Three identity package. A feature of this identity is also the music "Three Is The Magic Number", based (only the lyrics are copied) upon Schoolhouse Rock!.

BBC Online provided a number of downloads and activities based on the channel's identity, these included "BlobMate", screensavers, wallpapers and also games such as BlobLander and BlobBert. The idea used by both Lambie-Nairn, who had developed the branding for CBeebies and CBBC, and Aardman, was to create the BBC Three blobs as a relation to the green and yellow blobs of the children's channels. Kieron Elliott, Lola Buckley, Gavin Inskip and Jen Long provided out-of-vision continuity.

On 22 January 2008 a new channel identity was unveiled. Rebranding was carried out by Red Bee Media, along with agencies MPG and Agency Republic with music and sound design by creative audio company Koink.

In October 2013, BBC Three introduced a new series of idents with a theme of "discovery". Designed by Claire Powell at Red Bee Media, the idents utilised projection mapping effects. The soundtrack for the idents was composed by Chris Branch and Tom Haines at Brains & Hunch.

On 4 January 2016, alongside the announcement of the date for BBC Three's relaunch as an online-only service, a third logo was unveiled. Inspired by the iconography of mobile applications, the new logo incorporated the Roman numeral for the number 3, with the third bar replaced by an exclamation mark. Marketing head Nikki Carr explained that the three bars represented the three principles of BBC Three as a service; making viewers "think", "laugh", and have a voice.

The "tricon" was used as the service's primary logo until 2020, when a more conventional logo box was adopted—connecting and modifying the "T" and "H" in "Three" to resemble the tricon emblem. In October 2021, this wordmark was replaced with one in the BBC's corporate font "Reith Sans" as part of a larger rebranding of the BBC's television channels. The tricon remained in use as a secondary logo, such as in an ident used to present BBC Three programmes on BBC One after the rebrand.

The rebrand in 2021 proved to be short-lived, as with the service's linear relaunch in February 2022, BBC Three adopted a new identity developed by Superunion and BBC Creative, with idents featuring three animated, pink and purple-coloured hands named "Captain", "Spider", and "Pointer" interacting in a lime green backdrop. The channel's presentation features the hands "irreverently [observing] what's going on in popular culture and young people's lives".

Awards
The channel has had critical and popular successes. Most recently, it won Broadcast Magazine'''s Digital Channel of the Year Award for Best General Entertainment Channel, and MGEITF Non Terrestrial Channel of the Year.

It won more awards in its eleven-year broadcast history than its commercial rivals (Sky 1, Sky Living, E4, ITV2, Channel 5 and Comedy Central) have won in their combined 25-year history. In total BBC Three has won 7 BAFTA awards, 5 British Comedy Awards, 15 Royal Television Society Awards and 5 Rose d'Or Awards since the channel was launched in February 2003.

In 2008, BBC Three's Gavin & Stacey won the BAFTA audience award and the best comedy performance award was awarded to James Corden for his part.

Criticism
The channel came in for criticism from several corners, the most prominent of which came from some of the BBC's long-standing presenters. These included John Humphrys, who argued that BBC Three and BBC Four should be shut down in the face of budget cuts to BBC Radio 4's Today programme, which he presents, as well as Jeremy Paxman.

In July 2010 a UK music magazine printed a letter from the pressure group Friends of Radio 3 that criticised BBC Three for having 'comedies, game shows, films and documentaries, but no arts programming at all'. In a later issue another correspondent endorsed this assessment on the basis of a search through issues of the Radio Times, and cast doubt on the BBC's claim (in the document Performance Against Public Commitments 2009/10'') that the channel broadcast '54 hours of new music and arts programming' in that year. Two months later the same correspondent wrote in to inform readers that the BBC had refused his 'Freedom of Information' request concerning the titles of the programmes used in calculating the '54 hours' total.

Notes

References

External links

2003 establishments in the United Kingdom
2016 disestablishments in the United Kingdom
2022 establishments in the United Kingdom
BBC television channels in the United Kingdom
Television channels and stations established in 2003
Television channels and stations disestablished in 2016
Television channels in the United Kingdom
Television channels and stations established in 2022